The Doughty Block is a historic commercial building at 265 Water Street in downtown Augusta, Maine.  Built in 1890, it is the downtown's only example of a 19th-century high rise.  It was listed on the National Register of Historic Places in 1986.

Description and history
The Doughty Block stands in Augusta's downtown commercial district, on the east side of Water Street, opposite the Key Plaza just north of Front Street.  It is a six-story masonry structure, noticeably taller than the other 19th-century buildings lining the east side of Water Street.  It is built out of red brick with stone trim.  The front facade is three bays wide, with a modern storefront (c. 1970) on the ground floor.  The upper levels are divided by stone stringcourses, emphasizing the building horizontally, and its windows are set in round-arch openings, whose voussoirs alternate between stone and brick.  It has a project cornice at the top, studded with a combination of Italianate brackets and modillions.

The block was built in 1890 for Charles Doughty by Charles Fletcher, a prominent local builder.  The building's styling is somewhat retardaire, as the Italianate was out of fashion when it was built.  However, the styling of the windows gives it a suggestion of Renaissance style, which was then coming into fashion.

See also
National Register of Historic Places listings in Kennebec County, Maine

References

Commercial buildings on the National Register of Historic Places in Maine
National Register of Historic Places in Augusta, Maine
Italianate architecture in Maine
Buildings and structures completed in 1890
Buildings and structures in Augusta, Maine